The Master of the Harriers was a position in the British Royal Household, responsible for overseeing the Royal harriers. It was allowed to lapse in 1701, but was revived in 1730 as the "Master of the Harriers and Foxhounds". The position was abolished in a reorganization of the Royal Household in 1782.

Masters of the Harriers (from 1660)
1660: Thomas Elliott (senior)
1677: Thomas Elliott (junior)
1683: William Ryder
1689: Christopher Tancred
1701 Vacant
1730: Charles Howard, 3rd Earl of Carlisle
1738: Robert Walpole, 1st Baron Walpole
1751: Vacant
1754: Lord Robert Manners-Sutton
1756: Vacant
1761: Basil Feilding, 6th Earl of Denbigh

References
http://www.british-history.ac.uk/report.asp?compid=43816

Positions within the British Royal Household
Ceremonial officers in the United Kingdom
1782 disestablishments in Great Britain